2016 FIVB Beach Volleyball World Continental Cup was played in Sochi, Russia 6 - 10 July 2016, and was the final qualifying tournament for the 2016 Summer Olympics.

Men

Result
Qualified for the 2016 Summer Olympics:

Women

Pool A

Table

Pool B

Knockout stage

Result
Qualified for the 2016 Summer Olympics:

See also
Beach volleyball at the 2016 Summer Olympics – Women's qualification

References 

2016 in beach volleyball
Volleyball qualification for the 2016 Summer Olympics
Continental Beach Volleyball Cup